An administrative county was a first-level administrative division in England and Wales from 1888 to 1974, and in Ireland from 1899 until either 1973 (in Northern Ireland) or 2002 (in the Republic of Ireland). They are now abolished, although most Northern Ireland lieutenancy areas and Republic of Ireland counties have the same boundaries as former administrative countries.

History

England and Wales

The term was introduced for England and Wales by the Local Government Act 1888, which created county councils for various areas, and called them 'administrative counties' to distinguish them from the continuing statutory counties.

In England and Wales the legislation was repealed in 1974, and entities called 'metropolitan and non-metropolitan counties' in England and 'counties' in Wales were introduced in their place.  Though strictly inaccurate, these are often called 'administrative counties' to distinguish them from both the historic counties, and the ceremonial counties.

Scotland

For local government purposes Scottish counties were replaced in 1975 with a system of regions and island council areas.

Ireland
The Local Government (Ireland) Act 1898 created administrative counties in Ireland on the same model that had been used in England and Wales.

In Northern Ireland the administrative counties were replaced by a system of 26 districts on 1 October 1973. Section 131 of the Local Government Act (Northern Ireland) 1972 stated that "every county and every county borough shall cease to be an administrative area for local government purposes".

The areas of the former administrative counties (and county boroughs) remain in use for Lieutenancy purposes, being defined as the areas used "for local government purposes immediately before 1 October 1973, subject to any subsequent definition of their boundaries …".

In the Republic of Ireland the legislation that created them remained in force until 1 January 2002, when they were renamed as "counties" under the Local Government Act 2001.

New entities

The administrative counties that did not share the names of previous counties:

England

Scotland
Ross-shire and Cromartyshire (Ross and Cromarty)

Republic of Ireland
Dún Laoghaire–Rathdown, Fingal and South Dublin (County Dublin). Created in 1994.

See also
List of articles about local government in the United Kingdom

References

External links
The Boundary Committee for England
The Boundary Committee for Scotland
The Boundary Committee for Wales

Local government in the United Kingdom
Administrative counties
Defunct types of subdivision in the United Kingdom